Pestalotiopsis sydowiana is a plant pathogen infecting azaleas, heather, loquats, and rhododendrons.

References

External links
 USDA ARS Fungal Database

Fungal plant pathogens and diseases
Ornamental plant pathogens and diseases
sydowiana